Mona Singha (born 19 August 1931), also known by her stage name Kalpana Kartik, is a retired Hindi film actress. She starred in six films in the 1950s. She is the widow of the late Hindi film actor and film maker Dev Anand.

Mona Singha was a beauty queen while studying at St. Bede's College, Shimla. She was introduced to films by Chetan Anand of Navketan Films with the film Baazi in 1951. She co-starred with Dev Anand, whom she worked with in all her subsequent films. Her screen name – Kalpana Kartik – was given to her by Chetan Anand during this period.
Her other films were Aandhiyan (1952), Humsafar (1953), Taxi Driver (1954), House No. 44 (1954) and Nau Do Gyarah (1957).

Career
Mona Singha was born in a Punjabi Christian family in Lahore. Her father was a Tehsildar of Batala in Gurdaspur District and she was the youngest of five brothers and two sisters.  After the partition, her family moved to Shimla.

She was a student of the St. Bede's College, Shimla. In her graduation year, she won the Ms. Shimla contest and was noticed by Chetan Anand, a film-maker from Bombay. He was there with his wife Uma Anand, whose mother is Mona's cousin.  He convinced her family to allow her to join his fledgling film company, Navketan Films, as a leading lady. Thus, Mona Singha was re-christened Kalpana Kartik and she moved to Bombay (now known as Mumbai).  Her first film Baazi was a huge success and went on to become a landmark in Indian cinema.

She then acted in Taxi Driver, which was the 'coming of age' film of the Navketan banner. It was Navketan's first super-success and also the film on whose sets Dev Anand secretly married Kalpana Kartik during a lunch break. Kalpana's time in Navketan saw four different directors take reign - Guru Dutt, Chetan Anand, S. D. Burman and Vijay Anand. Nau Do Gyarah was her last film as actress.

Kalpana Kartik worked as an associate producer for Tere Ghar Ke Samne (1963), Jewel Thief (1967), Prem Pujari (1970), Shareef Budmaash (1973), Heera Panna (1973), and  Jaaneman (1976). Dev Anand played the lead role in these movies.

Personal life
In 1954, Mona and Dev Anand got married secretly while on a break during the shooting of Taxi Driver. They became parents in 1956 when Suneil Anand was born. Suneil has also acted in films. They also have a daughter named Devina. After Nau Do Gyarah, Kalpana quit films to become a home maker. She was born into a Christian Family and she still practices her faith. After her marriage, she chose to stay away from the limelight and has been away from the media since then.

Filmography

References

External links
 

People from Shimla
Living people
Actresses in Hindi cinema
20th-century Indian actresses
Indian film actresses
Actresses from Himachal Pradesh
1931 births